Anthony Merry (2 August 1756 – 14 June 1835) was a British diplomat.

Biography
The son of a London wine merchant, Anthony Merry served in various diplomatic posts in Europe between 1783 and 1803, holding mostly consular positions. In 1803 he married Elizabeth Leathes, widow of John Leathes of Herringfield House, Suffolk. He was Chargé d'Affaires in Madrid in 1796 and again in Copenhagen about 1799, and Minister ad interim in Paris in 1802. Merry was Britain's representative to the United States in Washington, D.C. from 1803 to 1806.

When Merry arrived in the United States, he was received without any hospitality by President Thomas Jefferson, who greeted him in casual clothes and bedroom slippers and was inclined to show hostility towards Britain through Merry. Merry and his wife were invited to dinner at the White House along with the French chargé d'affaires and his wife at a time when the two countries were at war with one another, a notable breach of etiquette. When Merry made a complaint about protocol to James Madison, Madison increased the offence by referring to it as "a matter of very little moment". Jefferson's hostility extended to Mrs. Merry, whom he called a "virago", though Aaron Burr greatly admired her.

From then on Merry found himself disgusted by America. Soon after, Aaron Burr came to Merry seeking help with detaching the Ohio and Mississippi valleys from the Union. Merry reported back to the Foreign Office that Burr was extremely willing and ready to seek revenge against the United States. In April 1805 Merry was again approached by Burr, who claimed that Louisiana was ready to leave the United States. Burr, however, after being dropped from the Presidential ticket, had not the money nor power to seize Louisiana. He, therefore, sought assistance from Britain through Merry. Unfortunately for Merry and Burr, Britain had a new Foreign Secretary, Charles James Fox, who was friendly with America. Fox found the request treasonous, and on 1 June 1806, recalled Merry to Britain. Burr's intention was no doubt to exploit the dissatisfaction of the populace of Louisiana with the purchase.

Merry did not expect to be employed again, but in 1807 the new British government sent him to Copenhagen to conciliate the Danes over the bombardment of Copenhagen. Merry was then sent as British Minister to Sweden from 1808, a post from which he retired in 1809. He then lived at Dedham, Essex until his death in 1835.

Merry was notorious for his grim and dour manner: Napoleon facetiously nicknamed him Toujours gai. He and his wife had a reputation for arrogance and petulance: Thomas Moore, who shared their voyage to America, later became a good friend but admitted that their incessant complaining made them bad travelling companions.

References

Further reading
 Steel, Anthony. "Anthony Merry and the Anglo-American Dispute about Impressment, 1803-6." Cambridge Historical Journal 9#3 (1949): 331-51. online.

1756 births
1835 deaths
Ambassadors of the United Kingdom to Sweden
Ambassadors of the United Kingdom to Denmark
Ambassadors of the United Kingdom to the United States
People from Dedham, Essex